Le Malzieu-Ville is a commune in the Lozère department in southern France. Medieval ramparts. Church. Tourist office. Leisure Park along the river Truyère.

Notable people
 Vital de Lestang (1588-1621), Bishop of Carcassonne
 Louis Bertrand Pierre Brun de Villeret (1773-1845), General, born and died at Le Malzieu
 Louis d'Aurelle de Paladines (1804-1877), General, born at Le Malzieu

See also
Communes of the Lozère department

References

Malzieuville
Lozère communes articles needing translation from French Wikipedia
Gévaudan